Brigadier General John Thomas Kennedy (July 22, 1885 – September 26, 1969) was an Officer in the United States Army who received the Medal of Honor for actions during the Philippine–American War and the last surviving US veteran of the war to receive the medal.

Biography
John Kennedy was born in Hendersonville, South Carolina. He attended The Citadel for one year, and graduated from West Point in 1908.  Upon graduation he was commissioned as a 2nd Lieutenant in the 6th Cavalry Regiment.

He served in the Philippines in 1909 and was awarded the Medal of Honor after being wounded leading an attack into a cave occupied by hostile Moro insurgents.

He transferred from the Cavalry to the Field Artillery in January 1917.  In World War I he served as a field artillery officer and rose to the rank of lieutenant colonel in the National Army.   After the war, he reverted to his Regular Army rank of Captain but was promoted to the rank of Major in June 1920. Kennedy served as the Professor of Military Science at Auburn University from 1926 to 1931.

He graduated from the Command and General Staff College in 1924 and from the Army War College in 1932.

During World War II he was the Post Commander at Fort Bragg, North Carolina, from 1942 to 1945 with the rank of Brigadier General.

He retired from the Army on January 31, 1946, and died at the Veterans Hospital in Columbia, South Carolina on September 26, 1969.

General John T. Kennedy is buried in Arlington National Cemetery and his grave is located in Section 7, plot 10076.

Awards
Medal of Honor
Distinguished Service Medal
Silver Star
Purple Heart
Legion of Merit
Philippine Campaign Medal
World War I Victory Medal
American Defense Service Medal
American Campaign Medal
World War II Victory Medal

Medal of Honor citation
Rank and organization: Second Lieutenant, U.S. Army, 6th U.S. Cavalry. Place and date: At Patian Island, Philippine Islands, July 4, 1909. Entered service at: Orangeburg, S.C. Birth: Hendersonville, S.C. Date of issue: Unknown.

Citation:

While in action against hostile Moros, he entered with a few enlisted men the mouth of a cave occupied by a desperate enemy, this act having been ordered after he had volunteered several times. In this action 2d Lt. Kennedy was severely wounded.

Dates of rank
Cadet, USMA – June 16, 1904
2nd Lieutenant – February 14, 1908
1st Lieutenant – December 18, 1914
Captain – February 26, 1917
Major (National Army) – August 5, 1917
Lieutenant Colonel (National Army) – June 25, 1918
Discharged from National Army – February 15, 1920
Major – June 20, 1920
Lieutenant Colonel – March 1, 1932
Colonel – January 1, 1937
Brigadier General (Army of the United States) – May 21, 1942
Retired (with rank of brigadier general) – January 31, 1946

See also

List of Medal of Honor recipients
List of Philippine–American War Medal of Honor recipients
Notable graduates of West Point

References

External links

Generals of World War II

1885 births
1969 deaths
United States Army Cavalry Branch personnel
United States Army Field Artillery Branch personnel
United States Army personnel of World War I
United States Army Medal of Honor recipients
People from Colleton County, South Carolina
Military personnel from South Carolina
Burials at Arlington National Cemetery
American military personnel of the Philippine–American War
United States Army generals
Philippine–American War recipients of the Medal of Honor
The Citadel, The Military College of South Carolina alumni
United States Military Academy alumni
United States Army generals of World War II
United States Army War College alumni
United States Army Command and General Staff College alumni
Recipients of the Silver Star